Bento Monogatari (often translated as 'Lunchbox Story') is a 2010 short film by Pieter Dirkx. It was selected for the 2011 Cannes Film Festival in the Cinéfondation section. The film was the director's graduation project at the Hogeschool Sint-Lukas Brussels film school.

Plot
A woman tries to put some new life into her failed marriage by delving into the world of Japanese pop-culture. Every morning, she prepares a cute Japanese lunchbox (bento) for her husband, Frank, who works in the waste collection center. Frank is more interested in his beautiful, young, male colleague and secretly throws his lunchbox away before anyone sees it.

Cast
 Bea Duchateau as Yvonne
 Dirk Lavrysen as Frank
 Bram Van Outryve as Gunther
 Sae Nozawa as PEN

See also
 Cinéfondation
 Cannes Film Festival

References

External links
 

2010 films
2010s Dutch-language films
2010 comedy films

2010 short films
Belgian comedy films